Kurtz & Friends is an American animation studio founded by Bob Kurtz in 1972. Based in Burbank, California, the studio is known for producing films and television commercials.

Kurtz & Friends has created/produced animated theatrical titles for most major studios including The Walt Disney Company, Universal Studios, MGM, Sony Entertainment, Columbia TriStar Motion Picture Group and Warner Bros. Titles include The Pink Panther, Are We Done Yet?, Four Rooms, George of the Jungle and City Slickers. Kurtz & Friends created the animation for the Emmy-winning specials David Macaulay: Roman City and Edith Ann's Christmas (Just Say Noël) which won a Peabody Award. The company also created animated sequences for Carlin on Campus, Jurassic Park and Minority Report. Bob Kurtz is the director on all Kurtz & Friends projects, and sometimes designs and writes as well. The studio utilizes traditional cel animation, and later digital ink and paint.

Filmography

Commercials

 Acura Integra (1994)
 AirTouch Cellular
 Alpha-Bits
 Anchorage Convention and Visitors Bureau (1981)
 Brown & Polson (1980s)
 Bullwinkle's Vitamin Soda Pop (1992)
 Burger King (2002)
 Cadillac Catera
 California Department of Public Health (1984, 1990, 2000, 2011, 2013)
 CenTrust Bank (1980s)
 Chef Jr. (1997)
 Chevron (1977)
 Coca-Cola Europe (2002)
 Comcast (1999)
 Cold Turkey (1996)
 Crunchi-O's (1970s)
 Drug Emporium (1990s)
 Einstein Bros. Bagels
 Energizer (2001)
 Fingos (1993)
 First Interstate Bank (1987)
 FOX (station ID; 1990s)
 Gallo (1980s)
 The Gas Company (1980s)
 Group W (1970s)
 Happy Carob (1970s)
 Honda UK (2005)
 Honey Smacks
 I Wink Lashes
 Idaho Potato Commission (2000s)
 In Step (1970s)
 Juicy Fruit (1990s)
 Junior (1996)
 Just Pants (1970s)
 Kemps (2001)
 Ken-L Ration (1980s)
 Kirin Company
 Kitty Salmon (1970s)
 Klondike (1980s)
 Knudsen (1970s)
 Kraft Singles (1992)
 Kroger (1980s)
 Laura Scudder Inc. (1986)
 Levi's (1974, 1978)
 Lincoln Park Zoo (1987)
 Lincoln Savings and Loan Association (1980s)
 Lipton (1970s)
 Log Cabin syrup (1970s)
 Louisiana Lottery (1990s)
 Mazda (1995)
 McDonald's (1984)
 Moore Syndication (1984, 2013)
 MultiGroup Health Plan (1980s)
 NBC Online
 Nesbitt's
 New Hampshire Office of Travel & Tourism Development (1980s)
 Parco (1990s)
 Rolling Thunder (1995)
 Raid (1990s)
 Sparkletts (1970s)
 Sunbeam Products (1973)
 Taco Bell (1990s)
 Toshiba (2011)
 United States Forest Service (1972, 1995)
 United States Postal Service (1990)
 Van de Kamp's (1970s)
 Wild World Films

References

External links

Mass media companies established in 1972
Film and television title designers
American animation studios